The women's 4 × 400 metres relay event at the 2003 Pan American Games was held on August 9.

Results

References
Results

Athletics at the 2003 Pan American Games
2003
2003 in women's athletics